The Infotainment Scan is the fifteenth album by The Fall, released in 1993 on Permanent Records in the UK and by Matador Records in the USA (the first of the band's albums to get an official American release since Extricate (1990)). At the time of its release, it was considered the band's most accessible album and came when the band were experiencing unprecedented recognition in the media. It entered the UK Albums Chart at number 9, making it their highest-charting album.

Track information
The album features covers of the Sister Sledge disco track "Lost in Music" and of Steve Bent's "I'm Going to Spain", an obscure song that Bent had performed on the British talent show New Faces in 1976 (Bent's version was included on The World's Worst Record album, compiled by disc jockey Kenny Everett in 1978). The CD edition of The Infotainment Scan also includes "Why Are People Grudgeful?", the only track to be released as a single (albeit in a different version). It is based on two reggae songs: "People Grudgeful" by Joe Gibbs and "People Funny Boy" by Lee "Scratch" Perry.

Of the original compositions on The Infotainment Scan, "Glam-Racket" drew much attention for its alleged criticism of Britpop band Suede, with the lyric "you are entrenched in suede", although Mark E. Smith denied it was a reference to the band and asserted that it was an attack on nostalgia. "The League of Bald-Headed Men", identified by Simon Reynolds as a "diatribe against gerontocracy", appears to borrow its riff from Led Zeppelin's "Misty Mountain Hop", despite Smith's claim that he had never heard the band's music. A remix of "The League of Bald-Headed Men", retitled "League Moon Monkey Mix", is also included on the CD edition.

"Paranoia Man in Cheap Sh*t Room" adapts its title from "Nervous Man in a Four Dollar Room", an episode of The Twilight Zone. Smith had previously borrowed episode titles "What You Need" and "Time Enough at Last" (and would later use "Kick the Can").

Reissues 
The Infotainment Scan was reissued by Artful in 1999 with the same track listing as the original CD editions. It was remastered and expanded to a double-CD set by Castle Music in 2006 with slightly amended artwork. The first disc followed the original CD album track order, while the second added B-sides, demos, alternate versions and radio sessions.

Critical reception

The Infotainment Scan received generally positive reviews. AllMusic's Ned Raggett called it "a winner and a half" and "one of the band's most playful yet sharp-edged releases", picking out "Paranoia Man in Cheap Sh*t Room" as a highlight. Jim Sullivan for The Boston Globe called it "10 tracks of caustic wit set to backing music that swirls one moment and grinds the next". Robert Christgau gave it a three-star "honorable mention", with the comment "great original sound, one hell of a cover band". Ben Thompson, in The Independent, gave it a positive review, stating "Smith's invective has rarely been more sharply honed" and that the band "have rarely sounded brighter". Simon Reynolds, reviewing it for The New York Times, stated it "may be one of the Fall's more approachable records, but Mr. Smith's lyrics are as caustic as ever". Keith Cameron, reviewing for the NME, said the album "stands at the very peak of their canon". Chuck Eddy, for Spin, was less enthusiastic, saying Smith "used to seem smarter" and accusing him of repeating himself. Mark Jenkins of The Washington Post stated "the album continues the swaggeringly uncompromising and hopelessly unmarketable mix of Craig Scanlon's scratchy guitar, bassist Stephen Hanley and drummer Simon Wolstencroft's loping thump, and Smith's caustic and cryptic, cut-up and spit-out poetry."

The album was included in Robert Dimery's 2005 book 1001 Albums You Must Hear Before You Die.

Track listing

Personnel
The Fall
 Mark E. Smith – vocals, tapes, production (2, 10)
 Craig Scanlon – guitar
 Steve Hanley – bass guitar, backing vocals
 Simon Wolstencroft – drums, programming
 Dave Bush – keyboards, programming, backing vocals
Additional personnel
 Rex Sargeant – production (1, 4–9, 11)
 Simon Rogers – production (3, 12)
 Pascal Le Gras – cover art

References

1993 albums
The Fall (band) albums
Matador Records albums